Alyona Sotnikova was the defending champion, but chose not to participate.

Zhang Shuai won the title, defeating Ysaline Bonaventure in the final, 6–3, 6–4.

Seeds

Draw

Finals

Top half

Bottom half

References
Main Draw

President's Cup - Singles